Overachievers (Chinese: 名門暗戰) is a 30-episode Hong Kong television drama produced by Marco Law for TVB and stars Wayne Lai, Raymond Wong, Edwin Siu, Power Chan, Raymond Cho, Nancy Wu and Maggie Shiu.

Synopsis
Unhappy about being under his father Chiang Shing Tin's constant and unreasonable control, Chiang Yuen/Mike is determined to break free from his family business to start up a company of his own. After many obstacles and failures, he receives help from Hugo, Mandy, and Siu Tien, and finally begins his cellphone application company. Desperate to prove to his father that he can become just as successful as him, Mike prepares to confront his father on the business front, especially when it becomes apparent that his father wants to crush his ambitions because he isn't his biological son.

On the other hand, Chiang Shing Tin's second son, Chiang Sing/Andy, begins to lose his status in the family because of his lack of capabilities. He has constant problems with his wife because he suspects her of having had an affair with his third brother, Chiang Tsun/Louie. Unbeknownst to everyone, Louie is actually gay and has been hiding in the closet for years. Through all these trials, Chiang Shing Tin's wife, Chau Ping, struggles to keep the family together, torn by her desire to help her biological son, Louie, rise to the helm and caring for her stepchildren, Mike and Andy.

Midway, after Mandy breaks up with him due to his refusal to let her know him for who he truly is, Hugo loses it and decides to surrender to the cold-blooded, power-hungry sociopath that he really is. He kills Louie after the latter threatens to go to the police about a murder he knows Hugo committed. He even marries the Chiang family's only daughter, Abby, using her to get into the firm and snatch the position of chairman from an ailing Chiang Shing Tin who suffers two debilitating strokes. He also sleeps with Ivy, Chiang Shing Tin's mistress, and uses her to gain more footing in his unscrupulous plans to introduce a virtual currency that will replace physical cash. Eventually, Hugo goes after Mike, furious that the latter tried to slow down his plans when they had worked together earlier. He ends up trying to kill Mandy because he can't accept she no longer loves him and is instead in a relationship with Chau Kan (Chau Ping's brother and Mike's uncle). Instead, he ends up getting Mike's pregnant wife, Flora, killed.

In the end, a mentally ill Andy stabs Hugo to death as the latter accepts an entrepreneurial award. Mike ends up taking over his father's company and revitalizing the business.

Cast

The Chiang family

Other cast

Viewership ratings

External links
K-TVB.net English Synopsis

TVB dramas
2014 Hong Kong television series endings